The 50th Street station is a local station on the IRT Broadway–Seventh Avenue Line of the New York City Subway. Located at the intersection of 50th Street and Broadway at the northwest corner of the Theater District, it is served by the 1 train at all times and by the 2 train during late nights.

The 50th Street station was constructed for the Interborough Rapid Transit Company (IRT) as part of the city's first subway line, which was approved in 1900. Construction of the line segment that includes the 50th Street station began on September 19 of the same year. The station opened on October 27, 1904, as one of the original 28 stations of the New York City Subway. The station's platforms have been lengthened since opening.

The 50th Street station contains two side platforms and four tracks; express trains use the inner two tracks to bypass the station. The station was built with tile and mosaic decorations. The platforms contain exits to 50th Street and Broadway and are not connected to each other within fare control.

History

Construction and opening 
Planning for a subway line in New York City dates to 1864. However, development of what would become the city's first subway line did not start until 1894, when the New York State Legislature authorized the Rapid Transit Act. The subway plans were drawn up by a team of engineers led by William Barclay Parsons, chief engineer of the Rapid Transit Commission. It called for a subway line from New York City Hall in lower Manhattan to the Upper West Side, where two branches would lead north into the Bronx. A plan was formally adopted in 1897, and all legal conflicts concerning the route alignment were resolved near the end of 1899.

The Rapid Transit Construction Company, organized by John B. McDonald and funded by August Belmont Jr., signed the initial Contract 1 with the Rapid Transit Commission in February 1900, under which it would construct the subway and maintain a 50-year operating lease from the opening of the line. In 1901, the firm of Heins & LaFarge was hired to design the underground stations. Belmont incorporated the Interborough Rapid Transit Company (IRT) in April 1902 to operate the subway.

The 50th Street station was constructed as part of the IRT's West Side Line (now the Broadway–Seventh Avenue Line) from 47th Street to 60th Street, for which work had begun on September 19, 1900. Work for that section had been awarded to Naughton & Company. By late 1903, the subway was nearly complete, but the IRT Powerhouse and the system's electrical substations were still under construction, delaying the system's opening. The 50th Street station opened on October 27, 1904, as one of the original 28 stations of the New York City Subway from City Hall to 145th Street on the West Side Branch.

Service changes and station renovations 
After the first subway line was completed in 1908, the station was served by local trains along both the West Side (now the Broadway–Seventh Avenue Line to Van Cortlandt Park–242nd Street) and East Side (now the Lenox Avenue Line). West Side local trains had their southern terminus at City Hall during rush hours and South Ferry at other times, and had their northern terminus at 242nd Street. East Side local trains ran from City Hall to Lenox Avenue (145th Street).

To address overcrowding, in 1909, the New York Public Service Commission proposed lengthening platforms at stations along the original IRT subway. As part of a modification to the IRT's construction contracts, made on January 18, 1910, the company was to lengthen station platforms to accommodate ten-car express and six-car local trains. In addition to $1.5 million (equivalent to $ million in ) spent on platform lengthening, $500,000 was spent on building additional entrances and exits. It was anticipated that these improvements would increase capacity by 25 percent. Both platforms were extended to the north and south. Six-car local trains began operating in October 1910. The Broadway–Seventh Avenue Line opened south of Times Square–42nd Street in 1918, thereby dividing the original line into an "H"-shaped system. The original subway north of Times Square thus became part of the Broadway–Seventh Avenue Line, and all local trains were sent to South Ferry.

In December 1922, the Transit Commission approved a $3 million project to lengthen platforms at 14 local stations along the original IRT line, including 50th Street and five other stations on the Broadway–Seventh Avenue Line. The commission postponed the platform-lengthening project in September 1923, at which point the cost had risen to $5.6 million.

The city government took over the IRT's operations on June 12, 1940. The IRT routes were given numbered designations in 1948 with the introduction of "R-type" rolling stock, which contained rollsigns with numbered designations for each service.  The Broadway route to 242nd Street became known as the 1 and the Lenox Avenue route as the 3.

The original IRT stations north of Times Square could barely fit local trains of five or six cars depending on the configuration of the trains. Stations on the line from 50th Street to 96th Street, excluding the 91st Street station, had their platforms extended in the 1950s to accommodate ten-car trains as part of a $100 million rebuilding program (equivalent to $ million in )  (equivalent to $ million in ). The joint venture of Rosoff Bros Inc. and Joseph Meltzer Associates Inc. received a contract to remodel the 50th Street, 59th Street, and 66th Street stations in February 1957. The platform extensions at the local stations were completed by early 1958. Once the project was completed, all 1 trains became local and all 2 and 3 trains became express, and eight-car local trains began operation. Increased and lengthened service was implemented during peak hours on the 1 train on February 6, 1959. Due to the lengthening of the platforms at 86th Street and 96th Street, the intermediate 91st Street station was closed on February 2, 1959, because it was too close to the other two stations.

In 1981, the Metropolitan Transportation Authority listed the station among the 69 most deteriorated stations in the subway system.

On September 4, 1987, Alex Cumba fell onto the tracks of the 50th Street station. Bystanders Edwin Ortiz, Jeff Kuhn, and Melvin Shadd jumped onto the tracks and attempted to lift Cumba back onto the platform, which was difficult due to Cumba's weight. The three were able to remove Cumba seconds before the train arrived. A recreation of the story aired on Rescue 911 on September 17, 1991.

In April 1988, the New York City Transit Authority (NYCTA) unveiled plans to speed up service on the Broadway–Seventh Avenue Line through the implementation of a skip-stop service: the 9 train. When skip-stop service started in 1989, it was only implemented north of 137th Street–City College on weekdays, and 50th Street was served by both the 1 and the 9. Skip-stop service ended on May 27, 2005, as a result of a decrease in the number of riders who benefited.

Station layout

Like other local stations, 50th Street has four tracks and two side platforms. The two express tracks are used by the 2 train during daytime hours and the 3 train at all times.

Design
As with other stations built as part of the original IRT, each platform consists of  concrete slabs, beneath which are drainage basins. The original platforms contain circular, cast-iron Doric-style columns spaced every , while the platform extensions contain I-beam columns. Additional columns between the tracks, placed atop the transverse arches, support the jack-arched concrete station roofs.

The decorative scheme consists of green faience station-name tablets, blue tile bands, a green cornice, and blue plaques. The mosaic tiles at all original IRT stations were manufactured by the American Encaustic Tile Company, which subcontracted the installations at each station. The decorative work was performed by tile contractor Manhattan Glass Tile Company and faience contractor Grueby Faience Company. The ceilings of the original platforms and fare control areas contain plaster molding. Most of the original tile plaques at this station were removed during remodeling, replaced by much simpler blue, green, and red mosaics with printed letters. One of the original tile plaques has been preserved by the New York Transit Museum.

The station contains the artwork Liliana Porter's Alice, The Way Out, a series of mosaics installed in 1994 depicting characters from Lewis Carroll's Alice in Wonderland.

Exits
Each platform has same-level fare control at the center and there are no crossovers or crossunders to allow free transfer between directions. Each fare control area has a token booth, turnstile bank, and newsstand. The northbound has four staircases to the streets: two to the northeast corner of 50th Street and Broadway, one to the southeast corner, and one inside a building on the south side of 50th Street midblock between Broadway and Seventh Avenue.

The southbound platform has an exit to an underground shopping arcade on the south side of 50th Street west of Broadway, where the "Nothing Really Matters" bar opened in 2022. Another exit goes to the southern sunken courtyard of Paramount Plaza on the northwest corner of 50th Street and Broadway.

References

External links 

 
 nycsubway.org – Alice: The Way Out Artwork by Liliana Porter (1994)
 MTA's Arts For Transit – 50th Street (IRT Broadway–Seventh Avenue Line)

IRT Broadway–Seventh Avenue Line stations
Broadway (Manhattan)
New York City Subway stations in Manhattan
Railway stations in the United States opened in 1904
1904 establishments in New York City
Midtown Manhattan